Soviet Song (18 February 2000 – 16 November 2015) was a racehorse bred and owned by Elite Racing Club. She was foaled on 18 February 2000, sired by Marju (IRE) out of Kalinka (IRE) (Soviet Star). She raced in England, Ireland and France during her career and she was the highest rated older filly in the World in 2004 and 2005.

Racing career
Soviet Song was trained at Newmarket by James Fanshawe during her 24 race career and she was ridden by only three jockeys, Oscar Urbina, Johnny Murtagh and Jamie Spencer.

Out of her 24 races on the flat over five years, she won 9 races with win prize money of £789,630, also finishing second 6 times and third 2 times, her total prize money during her racing career was £1,168,370. During her career she often had problems with her feet which resulted in her wearing stick-on horse shoes for some races. She won five Group One races altogether and never once finished out of the prize money.

Her stable name is Sovie and she is a half-sister to Penzance, who won the Triumph Hurdle at the Cheltenham Festival in 2005.

Two Year Old Season
She was ridden by Oscar Urbina for her two-year-old career in 2002 when she was unbeaten. Her first race as a two-year-old was on 17 July 2002 at Kempton Park Racecourse in the 6 furlong EBF Maiden Fillies' Stakes on good to firm ground. With a poor low draw and after missing the start she was slowly away, she dwelt in the rear but made good progress over 3f out. She led the race over 1f out, pressed inside the final furlong by the favourite Airwave (a future Group One winning horse), she ran on well to win by half a length at 6/1.

She stepped up in class for her next outing, the Listed Sweet Solera Stakes at Newmarket Racecourse. On 10 August 2002 she won the 7 furlong race by an impressive three lengths on very soft ground. Sent off at 4/1 second favourite, the race was run in a downpour and she was held up in the rear of the field, making headway over 1f out, she pulled right away inside the final furlong and quickened clear of the rest of the horses which included Summitville who would go on to be third in The Oaks the following season.

She ended the season by winning her first Group One race in the Fillies' Mile at Ascot. The race took place on 28 September 2002 on good to firm ground, and sent off the 11/10 favourite she was held up in touch, switching left and then making steady headway 2 furlongs out. She led inside the final furlong and won the one mile race comfortably, beating the next season's Epsom Oaks winner Casual Look into second place by one and a half lengths. After winning this race Soviet Song was installed as favourite for the 2003 1,000 Guineas classic race by bookmakers.

Three Year Old Season
She did not win as a three-year-old but ran some excellent races in defeat. On 4 May 2003 she ran – despite an interrupted preparation – in the first fillies-only Classic race of the season, the 1,000 Guineas at Newmarket. Ridden again by Oscar Urbina on good to firm ground, she travelled strongly in the race, being held up, she came through 2 furlongs out before her effort flattened out up the hill and she could not find any extra inside the final furlong. She was beaten into fourth place by the eventual winner Russian Rhythm, with the future Breeders' Cup Mile winner Six Perfections in second place together with the future Breeders' Cup Filly & Mare Turf winner Intercontinental back in third place.

Four Year Old Season
2004 was her best season with four wins, three in Group One races including the Sussex Stakes at Goodwood against the colts.  She also won the Falmouth Stakes at the Newmarket July meeting showing a brilliant turn of foot, with 2004's hitherto-unbeaten One Thousand Guineas winner Attraction in second place.

Five Year Old Season
Illness cut short her five-year-old season but she still won her second Group One Falmouth Stakes.

Six Year Old Season
Her last racing season during 2006 produced a win in the Group Two Windsor Forest Stakes at Ascot.

Awards and honours
Racehorse Owners Association/Racing Post Award for Outstanding Older Horse (2004)
BHB Champion Older Female Flat Horse (2004)
Cartier Award for Top Older Horse (2004)
Highest rated older filly in the World (2004)
BHB Champion Older Female Flat Horse (2005)
Joint highest rated older filly in the World (2005) along with Alexander Goldrun and Pride.

Retirement
It was announced on 9 October 2006 that Soviet Song had run her last race and she was being retired to Kirtlington Stud in Oxfordshire to spearhead Elite Racing Club's highly successful breeding programme.  Although she failed to get in foal in 2007 despite being covered by two different stallions, in 2008 she was scanned in foal to promising young stallion Oasis Dream.  Her first foal, a colt, was born on 28 January 2009, and named Soviet Dream. Further attempts between 2009 and 2011 to get her in foal were unsuccessful and she was based in the United States for treatment before the 2012 breeding season. She foaled a filly by Speightstown on 6 February 2014. She was euthanised on 16 November 2015 at Oak Lodge Stud in Kentucky.

Race record

Prize money

Pedigree

Notes

External links
Elite Racing Club
Kirtlington Stud
 Career 1-2-3 Colour Chart – Soviet Song

References
Soviet Song's pedigree
Soviet Song's form on Racing Post

2000 racehorse births
Racehorses bred in Ireland
Racehorses trained in the United Kingdom
Cartier Award winners
Thoroughbred family 20-a
2015 racehorse deaths